Michel Boutard (born 21 April 1956) is a French gymnast. He competed at the 1976 Summer Olympics, the 1980 Summer Olympics and the 1984 Summer Olympics.

References

1956 births
Living people
French male artistic gymnasts
Olympic gymnasts of France
Gymnasts at the 1976 Summer Olympics
Gymnasts at the 1980 Summer Olympics
Gymnasts at the 1984 Summer Olympics
Place of birth missing (living people)